Trichophantasis subtuberculata is a species of beetle in the family Cerambycidae. It was described by Stephan von Breuning in 1967.

References

Phantasini
Beetles described in 1967